Anita Schätzle (born 22 September 1981 in Haslach im Kinzigtal) is a German female freestyle wrestler. She participated in Women's freestyle wrestling 72 kg at 2008 Summer Olympics. In the 1/8 final she beat French wrestler Audrey Prieto, but she lost in the quarterfinal to Agnieszka Wieszczek.

At Women's freestyle 72 kg at 2004 Summer Olympics she finished at 6th place.

References

External links 
 Wrestler profile on beijing2008.com
 Official website

1981 births
Living people
People from Haslach im Kinzigtal
Sportspeople from Freiburg (region)
German female sport wrestlers
Olympic wrestlers of Germany
Wrestlers at the 2008 Summer Olympics
Wrestlers at the 2004 Summer Olympics
20th-century German women
21st-century German women